The 2011 season of the Polish American Football League (PLFA I) was the 6th season played by the major american football league in Poland. It was the first time that the PLFA I consisted of ten teams. The regular season took place between April 2 and June 19, 2011. The Polish champion was determined in the play-off final; the VI SuperFinal PLFA (known as the Polish Bowl VI). The Crew Wrocław (last year runner-up) beat the defending champion Devils Wrocław 27–26. The championship game was broadcast live on Sportklub channel, as a first PLFA game ever.

Regular season

Results table

Standings 

Source: pzfa.pl

Postseason

Bracket

See also 
 2011 in sports

References

External links 
 Polish American Football Association

Polish American Football League seasons
Poland
2011 in Polish sport